Vitaliy Zheludok (born 11 August 1986) is a Belarusian former professional footballer.

Career
On 20 February 2018, the BFF banned him from football for life for his involvement in the match-fixing.

References

External links

Profile at teams.by

1986 births
Living people
Belarusian footballers
Association football goalkeepers
Belarusian expatriate footballers
Expatriate footballers in Greece
FC Darida Minsk Raion players
FC Osipovichi players
FC Kommunalnik Slonim players
Platanias F.C. players
FC Minsk players
FC Rechitsa-2014 players
FC Lida players
FC Slutsk players
FC Oshmyany players